Xavier Tyrone Avery (born January 1, 1990) is an American former professional baseball outfielder who played for the Baltimore Orioles in 2012.

Career

Baltimore Orioles
Avery attended Cedar Grove High School in Ellenwood, Georgia. He initially committed to play college football for the Georgia Bulldogs. The Baltimore Orioles drafted Avery in the second round of the 2008 Major League Baseball Draft.

Avery was called up to the majors for the first time on May 13, 2012. The following day, he scored his first major league run and collected his first double, triple and RBI. He hit his first career home run on June 29, 2012 against the Cleveland Indians. The Orioles optioned Avery to Norfolk in July, and recalled him again September 1 when the team's roster expanded

Seattle Mariners
On August 30, 2013, the Orioles traded Avery to the Seattle Mariners in exchange for Michael Morse. He was designated for assignment on March 28, 2014 and subsequently outrighted to the Triple-A Tacoma Rainiers, where he finished the season.

Detroit Tigers
On November 21, 2014, Avery signed a minor league contract with the Detroit Tigers. He was released on July 1, 2015 after exercising an opt-out in his contract.

San Francisco Giants
On July 3, 2015, Avery signed a minor league deal with the San Francisco Giants. He was released on July 21.

Minnesota Twins
On July 26, 2015, Avery signed with the Minnesota Twins. He completed the season on the roster of their Triple-A Rochester Red Wings.

Second stint with Orioles
On December 15, Avery signed a minor league deal to return to the Orioles organization. He became a free agent after the 2016 season.

Atlanta Braves
On January 23, 2017, Avery signed a minor league contract with the Atlanta Braves. He re-signed with the team after the 2017 season ended. He elected free agency on November 3, 2018.

References

External links

1990 births
Baltimore Orioles players
Baseball players from Atlanta
Bowie Baysox players
Delmarva Shorebirds players
Frederick Keys players
Gulf Coast Orioles players
Living people
Major League Baseball outfielders
Mesa Solar Sox players
Norfolk Tides players
Sacramento River Cats players
Scottsdale Scorpions players
Tacoma Rainiers players
Toledo Mud Hens players
Rochester Red Wings players
Gwinnett Braves players
Gwinnett Stripers players